Wheeler is a village in Jasper County, Illinois, United States. The population was 147 at the 2010 census.

Geography
Wheeler is located in western Jasper County. Illinois Route 33 passes through the north side of the village, leading southeast  to Newton, the county seat, and northwest  to Effingham.

Demographics

As of the census of 2000, there were 119 people, 41 households, and 30 families residing in the village. The racial makeup of the village was 99.16% White, 0.84% from other races. Hispanic or Latino of any race were 3.36% of the population.

There were 41 households, out of which 41.5% had children under the age of 18 living with them, 51.2% were married couples living together, 19.5% had a female householder with no husband present, and 26.8% were non-families. 22.0% of all households were made up of individuals, and 9.8% had someone living alone who was 65 years of age or older. The average household size was 2.90 and the average family size was 3.43.

In the village, the population was spread out, with 34.5% under the age of 65, 11.8% from 18 to 65, 29.4% from 25 to 44, 14.3% from 45 to 64, and 10.1% who were 65 years of age or older. The median age was 27 years. For every 100 females, there were 116.4 males. For every 100 females age 18 and over, there were 95.0 males.

The median income for a household in the village was $24,250, and the median income for a family was $23,333. Males had a median income of $24,500 versus $14,375 for females. The per capita income for the village was $9,425. There were 28.1% of families and 27.4% of the population living below the poverty line, including 37.5% of under eighteens and 18.8% of those over 64.

References

Villages in Jasper County, Illinois
Villages in Illinois